The Garden is a 1968 Czechoslovak film directed by Jan Švankmajer. It is based on a story by Ivan Kraus Living Fence.

Plot
Josef invites his old friend Franta to his home. Franta is shocked when he finds out that the house is surrounded by people who are holding their hands. Josef show Franta his garden but Franta eventually asks who are these people. Josef tells him it is his hedge (lit. "living fence" in Czech). Josef eventually tells that people in the fence are volunteers that Josef has some knowledge about. Franta eventually finds his place in the fence.

Cast
Jiří Hálek as Franta
Luděk Kopřiva as Josef
Míla Myslíková as Miluš
Václav Borovička as Borůvka
František Husák as Man in rubber coat

References

External links
 

1968 films
1960s Czech-language films
Czechoslovak mystery films
Czech short films
Czech mystery films
Films directed by Jan Švankmajer
1960s Czech films
Czechoslovak short films